St Sebastian is a 20th-century painting by the Bohemian artist Bohumil Kubišta. Saint Sebastian was a Christian martyr. It is held in the National Gallery in Prague.

The picture is painted in oils on canvas and has dimensions of 98 x 74,5 cm. It is one of the most important works of Bohumil Kubishta, member of the pre-First World War Czech avant-garde. Unlike traditional Christian interpretations of the theme of suffering of the Christian martyr, Bohumil Kubishta combines cubist forms and expressiveness, but integrates spiritual strength.

References 

Czech paintings
Avant-garde art
Paintings in the collection of the National Gallery Prague
Kubishta